Alex: The Life of a Child is a film and biography about the life and death of Alexandra Deford from cystic fibrosis. After her death in 1980 at the age of eight, her father, Frank Deford, a sportswriter, was inspired to write a memoir about Alex three years later. The book depicts Alex's determination to make the best of her circumstances and brings awareness to the disease that took her life.

The book was adapted into a 1986 film by ABC starring Craig T. Nelson as Frank Deford, Bonnie Bedelia as Carol Deford, and Gennie James, as Alex Deford.

Production
Frank Deford pieced together a collection of his own memories and that of his wife, Carol, as well as interactions from Alex's classmates, nurses, and hospital volunteers. The story of her life is mostly written in chronological order with certain recollections from her final years weaved in between. The final pages are an epilogue describing the Deford family's experiences after her passing.

Synopsis 
Alexandra Deford was born on October 30, 1971, to Frank and Carol Deford. Upon her birth no alarms were raised and the Deford's believed they were bringing home a healthy baby. At four months, Alex began to show symptoms that were concerning, such as a sickly pallor to her skin and an inability to gain weight. The Defords took her to several hospitals, but did not receive a correct diagnosis. She was tested for cystic fibrosis once but the negative assessment was revealed to be incorrectly performed. Alexandra was correctly diagnosed at Boston Children's Hospital. 

Growing up Alexandra was always very thin and could barely laugh without choking on her own mucus. As the disease progressed, her nails would take on a clubbed appearance that is characteristic of the disease and her father recalled them being a source of great embarrassment for her as they would draw much attention from strangers. Her daily routine consisted of taking a variety of medications and getting her chest "pounded on" by her parents to clear her lungs of mucus, which Frank Deford described as a very unpleasant and painful experience for Alex. The book depicted Alex's discomfort with her frequent visits to the hospital as a cause of often feeling lonesome and missing social activities. Her classmates described Alex as a child that did not use her disease to make excuses for herself and that she loved to laugh and be involved in everything.  Many sections of the book show Alex's love for dress-up and jewelry that was gaudy and glittering. Frank Deford wrote about several instances in which Alex would have insight into matters that were far beyond typical for children her age. She was protective and concerned with her family, always trying to divert them from being sad in moments when she was hurting. She was especially worried about her older brother who she felt would be overshadowed by the attention that her disease was consuming. As the years went by, she would begin to ask more and more questions about death to those she entrusted to tell her the truth as she was beginning to come to terms with her fate.

The start of third grade was the beginning of the end for Alex when she had a collapsed lung. Her lung would collapse again, but was dismissed when a young doctor ignored Alex's protestations. Her illness progressively worsened, but she survived through the holidays. On January 19, 1980, Alex died in her home surrounded by her loved ones.

Exactly a year after their daughter's burial, Alex and Carol Deford adopted a baby girl from the Philippines. Frank was apprehensive at the idea of what he initially felt would be "replacing" Alex.  Carol pointed out that it would have been the answer to one of Alex's nightly prayers. Frank would eventually dedicate the book to Scarlet so that she would grow up to know who Alexandra Deford was.

Reception 
John O'Connor writes about the film in a review for The New York Times, saying it is "generally shrewd enough to let the intrinsically affecting story tell itself. For the most part, there is no belaboring the obvious. ... This is an instance where a television movie decidedly transcends its formula." In the Richmond Times review "Don't miss 'Alex: The Life of a Child'", Katherine Phillips states that "The painful realities of cystic fibrosis are given stark visual life – a romp with her father leaves Alex coughing blood, and the inability to catch her breath leaves her crying in helpless fright and anger." Reviewing for The San Francisco Chronicle, Donald Chase writes that Alex's "extraordinary, heart-rending humor and nobility during her painful ordeal" are "captured in the film".

Frank Deford and the book were listed as a stepping stone to the success of the Cystic Fibrosis Foundation.

References 

1983 non-fiction books
American biographies
American memoirs
Works about cystic fibrosis